Follow Me is the second album of Dutch singer Do.

It did well in the Netherlands, debuting at #8 in the Mega Top 100 (album chart).

Album information
After her successful debut album Do she began working on her second album with her best friend and musical partner Glenn Corneille. They made a basis for the next album but Glenn Corneille died in a car disaster. However, do need to go on, so she started again where she left off.

The album contains 12 songs. Do co-write 3 songs; Love Me, Tune Into Me, and When Everything is Gone. It features several different music genres, such as Pop, Jazz, Gospel , and Country.

Track listing

Chart positions

References
.

2006 albums
Do (singer) albums
Sony BMG albums